TaxAct Holdings, Inc. is an American tax preparation software company based in Cedar Rapids, Iowa. The company offers its own software package "TaxAct" to individual tax registers, companies and professional affiliates. The company was founded in 1998.

History 
TaxAct Holdings, Inc. was founded in 1998 as 2nd Story Software by Lance Dunn, the former Vice President of software development at Parsons Technology. Later, Lance Dunn recruited Jerry McConnell and Alan Sperfslage as developers, and Cammie Greif as a marketer.

In 2000, a cloud-based version of TaxAct software was released. In 2004, TA Associates, a private equity firm based in Boston, acquired two-thirds of the company for $89 million.

In October 2010, H&R Block said it would pay $287.5 million in cash to acquire the parent firm of TaxAct. In May 2011 the U.S. Department of Justice attempted to stop the acquisition in an antitrust lawsuit. In November 2011, a federal judge sided with the Justice Department, and both companies mutually terminated the contract.

In January 2012, 2nd Story Software was sold to Seattle-based Blucora (formerly Infospace, Inc.) for more than $287 million. In 2013, the name was officially changed to TaxAct Holdings, Inc. Subsequently, in October of the same year, TaxAct acquired Balance Financial, the company that specializes in personal finance tools and services.

In 2018, former Intuit executive Curtis Campbell was appointed as the President of the company. 

TaxAct is a member of the Free File Alliance, a free federal tax preparation and electronic filing program for eligible individual taxpayers developed through a partnership between the IRS and a group of private sector tax software companies.

In November 2022, private equity firm Cinven agreed to acquire TaxAct for about $720 million. Cinven announced it would combine TaxAct's business with Drake Software, which it acquired the previous year, under a single holding company.

Product overview 
TaxAct offers tax preparation software for individuals, small businesses, and tax professionals.  They offer both online and download products, and have a mobile app available for iOS and Android.  

There are several online plans: Free, Deluxe, Premier, Self- Employed, Business, and Pro. TaxAct offers a free federal version for basic returns. 

In March 2018 TaxAct Online Freelancer Edition was awarded the title of "The best tax software for independent contractors" by Business Insider.

References

External links 
 
 TaxAct IRS Free File Program

Financial services companies established in 1998
Tax software of the United States
2012 mergers and acquisitions
American corporate subsidiaries
Announced mergers and acquisitions